The United Protestant Church of France is the main and largest Protestant church in France, created in 2013 through the unification of the Reformed Church of France and the Evangelical Lutheran Church of France. It is active in all parts of Metropolitan France apart from Alsace and Moselle, where the Union of Protestant Churches of Alsace and Lorraine is established.

It has 250,000 members and its orientation is both Calvinist and Lutheran, mainly in that it incorporates both kinds of parishes throughout the country. Ordination of women and blessings of same-sex marriages are allowed.

See also
 Huguenots
 National Union of Independent Reformed Evangelical Churches of France
 Protestant Church of Augsburg Confession of Alsace and Lorraine
 Protestant Federation of France
 Protestant Reformed Church of Alsace and Lorraine

References

External links
 

Huguenots
Lutheran World Federation members
Lutheranism in France
Members of the World Communion of Reformed Churches
Protestantism in France
Reformed denominations in France
Christian organizations established in 2013